Doreen Gildroy is an American poet.

Life
She graduated from the University of Illinois with a B.A. and Warren Wilson College with an M.F.A.  Her work has appeared in The American Poetry Review, The Antioch Review, The Colorado Review, The Marlboro Review, TriQuarterly, The Virginia Quarterly Review, and Volt.

She lives in California with her husband, poet Michael Ryan, and their daughter, Emily.

Awards
 2002 John C. Zacharis First Book Award
 Bread Loaf Writers' Conference Robert Frost Fellow in Poetry

Works
"How She Moves Her Hand", American Poetry Review, Vol. 36 No. 3
American Poetry Review, Vol. 33 No. 5
"What I Looked at Today ", Ploughshares, Winter 1998-99
"Winds", Ploughshares, Winter 1998-99
"Viva Vox", Ploughshares, Winter 2005-06 
"Human Love", Slate, Sept. 27, 2005

References

External links
"“Worth Taking the Trouble to Say”: A Conversation with James McMichael", AGNI online

Warren Wilson College alumni
Year of birth missing (living people)
Living people
American women poets
21st-century American women